Ant-Man and the Wasp (Original Motion Picture Soundtrack) is the film score for the Marvel Studios film Ant-Man and the Wasp. The score was composed by Christophe Beck. Hollywood Records released the album digitally on July 6, 2018.

Background
In June 2017, Ant-Man and the Wasp director Peyton Reed confirmed that Christophe Beck, who composed the score for Ant-Man, would return for Ant-Man and the Wasp. Beck reprised his main theme from Ant-Man, and also wrote a new one for Hope van Dyne / Wasp that he wanted to be "high energy" and show that she is more certain of her abilities than Scott Lang / Ant-Man. When choosing between these themes for specific scenes throughout the film, Beck tried to choose the Wasp theme more often so there would be "enough newness in the score to feel like it’s going new places, and isn’t just some retread." Hollywood Records and Marvel Music released the soundtrack album digitally on July 6, 2018.

In April 2019, Mondo released a vinyl album (2XLP), featuring 14 previously unreleased bonus tracks. This album is to be the first of several Marvel soundtracks released on vinyl in limited numbers. Ant-Man and the Wasps score, for example, only released 1,000 copies with original artwork and options on vinyl record album coloring.

Track listing
All music composed by Christophe Beck.

Vinyl track listings

Disc 1 Side A
 It Ain’t Over till the Wasp Lady Stings
 Prologue
 Ghost in the Machine
 World’s Greatest Grandma
 A Little Nudge
 Feds
 Ava’s Story

Disc 1 Side B
 Wings & Blasters
 Utmost Ghost
 Tracker Swarm
 Cautious as a Hurricane
 Misdirection
 Quantum Leap
 I Shrink, Therefore I Am
 Partners
 Windshield Wipeout

Disc 2 Side A
 Hot Wheels
 Revivification
 A Flock of Seagulls
 San Francisco Giant
 Ghost = Toast
 Reduce Yourself
 Quit Screwing Around
 Arthropodie
 Baba Yaga Lullaby (Performed by David Dastmalchian)

Disc 2 Side B
 Anthill
 Let's Fly, Antoinette!
 The Lab
 Mission Pympossible
 Anterrogation
 Shrinking and Phasing
 This Old House
 Let's Blow This Pez Stand
 Quantum Dash
 Pigeons! Ahhh (Demo)
 Origins (Demo)
 Buenos Aires, 1987 (Demo)
 Tunnel Go Boom! (Demo)
 Elementary School

Additional music
One additional song, "Come On Get Happy" by The Partridge Family, is featured in the film, but was not included on the soundtrack album.
Two songs found in the film, "Everyday Is Like Sunday" by Morrissey, and "Spooky" by Dusty Springfield, were not included on the soundtrack album.

The vinyl release of the soundtrack listed above features some 14 additional tracks not previously released with the main score.  They can be found on Disc 2, Side B.

References

2018 soundtrack albums
2010s film soundtrack albums
Marvel Cinematic Universe: Phase Three soundtracks
Ant-Man (film series)